Jussi Lampi (born 9 February 1961 in Lappajärvi) is a Finnish musician and long-time actor. Lampi has appeared in many films and TV shows, including The Last Border (1993), V2 - jäätynyt enkeli (2007), Matti (2006), Pelikaanimies (2004), Rölli ja metsänhenki (2001), Ansa ja Oiva and Ruusun aika. It is believed that Lampi started his recording career in the band Bodyguards. Lampi has played and is still playing in the band Pink Flamingos since 1993. The band has published one album, Pink Flamingos, through Strawberry Records. Currently Lampi plays the drums and is a background singer in Timo Rautiainen's band. Lampi has also worked as a voice actor in the Finnish dubs of Monsters, Inc., The Wild, the first Pokémon film as Mewtwo, and Finding Nemo.

Lampi's daughter was Mandi Lampi, a former famous child actor who died at only 19 years of age on 27 February 2008.

References

External links
 
 

1961 births
Living people
People from Lappajärvi
Finnish male musicians
Finnish male stage actors
Finnish male voice actors
Finnish male film actors
Finnish male television actors
20th-century Finnish male singers
Finnish drummers
21st-century Finnish male singers